A birthmark is a blemish on the skin formed before birth.

Birthmark may also refer to:

 "Birthmarks" (House), an episode of the television series House
 Birthmark (Teen Titans), an episode of the television series Teen Titans
 "The Birth-Mark", a romantic short story written by Nathaniel Hawthorne in 1846
 Birthmark is the pseudonym of Nate Kinsella, an American musician

Music
 Birthmark (album) 2013, by Lotte Anker 
 Birthmarks (Ozark Henry album)
 Birthmarks (Born Ruffians album) 2013